John Robert Baker (8 May 1878 – 28 February 1950) was an Australian rules footballer who played with Geelong in the Victorian Football League (VFL).

Notes

External links 

1878 births
1950 deaths
Australian rules footballers from Victoria (Australia)
Australian Rules footballers: place kick exponents
Geelong Football Club players
Newtown Football Club players